Mount Polhov Gradec (Polhograjska gora, or Pograjska gora), also known as Mount Saint Lawrence, is a hill in the Polhov Gradec Hills. It rises above the town of Polhov Gradec.

Church

There is a church dedicated to Saint Lawrence at the top of the hill. The church was first mentioned in written sources in 1526.

Cultural heritage
In addition to Saint Lawrence's Church, other cultural heritage features registered on Mount Polhov Gradec include the following:
 The Potok Chapel-Shrine—also known as the Logar Chapel-Shrine or Gora Chapel-Shrine—dates from 1892. It stands between two large linden trees at house no. 18, northeast of the church.
 The Mount Saint Lawrence archaeological site encompasses the summit of the hill. It consists of the remnants of a late Roman-era fortified settlement on the northeast slope below the church with the remains of a defensive wall and smithy.

References

External links

Mount Polhov Gradec on Geopedia.si
Mount Polhov Gradec on Hribi.net, Routes and photos

Polhov Gradec
Municipality of Dobrova–Polhov Gradec